Robert John Eagle (born 23 February 1987) is an English footballer who plays for  side Lowestoft Town, where he plays as a midfielder.

As a professional he has represented three clubs, starting his career with Norwich City before playing for Inverness Caledonian Thistle and Grimsby Town. He moved into semi-professional football in 2012 following a loan spell with Alfreton Town he later played for Lowestoft Town, A.F.C. Sudbury and Leiston. In February 2020 he was convicted of sexual assault in a Norwich nightclub and was ordered to carry out 140 hours of unpaid work and put on the sex offender registry for 5 years.

Playing career

Norwich City
Eagle was a product of the Norwich City youth system and made his first team debut on 19 September 2006 when he started Norwich's League Cup tie with league one outfit Rotherham United in which he helped Norwich to a 4–2 victory. He went on to make 10 league appearances before the end of the 2006–07 season. On 3 April 2007, Robert signed a new one-year contract with the club.

Eagle did not feature under manager Glenn Roeder in the 2007–08 season, but was awarded a new one-year contract in the summer of 2008. However, in April 2009 he was released by the club.

Inverness Caledonian Thistle
In July 2009, Eagle joined Inverness Caledonian Thistle on trial, and played in a pre-season friendly against Highland League side Buckie Thistle. Eagle supplied the cross for Richie Foran to head the first goal in a 2–0 win for Caley. Eagle went on to play for Inverness during the 2009–2010 season. The song by Haircut 100, 'Love Plus One,' was sung regularly by the Inverness crowd as a way of showing their appreciation to Eagle, whose hair they were very fond of.

Grimsby Town
In July 2010, Eagle joined Football League One side Leyton Orient on trial, and then moved on to Grimsby Town. After a successful trial period with The Mariners, he signed for the club on a two-year deal on 5 August 2010. He scored his first goal against Forest Green Rovers going on to score another to help Town to a 3–3 draw. Eagle went on to bag himself some tremendous goals, including a strike from inside the centre circle in the 6–1 away win at Histon.

Following the departure of manager Neil Woods on 23 February 2011, Eagle began to fall out of contention at Grimsby Town following the appointment of joint managers Rob Scott and Paul Hurst on 23 March 2011.

On 23 November 2011 he signed on loan with fellow Conference National side Alfreton Town. Eagle had an impressive spell with Alfreton Town, with manager Nicky Law even hailing the impact Eagle, and fellow player Adam Quinn had during their loan spells.

Non-League
Eagle was released from his contract at Grimsby Town in early January 2012 and moved to Lowestoft Town on a non-contract basis, playing in a match with Kirkley & Pakefield and scoring in the first minute.

Robert signed for Isthmian League Premier Division side A.F.C. Sudbury on 19 May 2016. A.F.C. Sudbury finished the 2016–17 season in 23rd position and were relegated.

Eagle was confirmed as signed for him home town club Leiston on 30 May 2017 on a two-year contract. Robert made his Leiston debut on 12 August 2017 in an Isthmian League Premier Division home fixture against Dorking Wanderers, which the home side won 1-0 courtesy of a goal from Kyle Hammond.

Eagle scored his first goal for Leiston on 23 September 2017 in an Isthmian League Premier Division home fixture against Metropolitan Police, coming on as an 88th minute substitute for Dominic Docherty, and scoring on the 95th minute with practically the last kick of the ball, to help the club to a convincing 3-0 victory. It was confirmed on 6 February 2018, that Eagle had re-joined Isthmian League Premier Division side Lowestoft Town for the remainder of the 2017–18 season. Eagle made 11 appearances for Lowestoft Town.

Robert returned to Leiston on 14 November 2018 in a player-coach capacity, having played the previous night in a Suffolk Premier Cup fixture against Haverhill Rovers, where he scored the 4th goal in a 6-1 win. On 16 June 2019, Leiston confirmed that Eagle, along with Byron Lawrence had signed contracts for the 2018–19 season.

On 10 June 2022, Eagle signed for relegated former side Lowestoft Town, who will contest the 2022–23 season in the Isthmian League North Division.

Personal life
Robert has a brother who has played non league football for Leiston.

On 25 February 2020 he was convicted of sexual assault on a woman at a Norwich nightclub.

He was ordered to do 140 hours of unpaid work and put on the sex offender registry for 5 years.

Career statistics

Honours

Grimsby Town
Lincolnshire Senior Cup: Winner, 2011–12

References

External links

Robert Eagle at Norwich City F.C.
Robert Eagle at Flown From the Nest

Living people
1987 births
English footballers
Norwich City F.C. players
Inverness Caledonian Thistle F.C. players
Grimsby Town F.C. players
Alfreton Town F.C. players
Lowestoft Town F.C. players
A.F.C. Sudbury players
Leiston F.C. players
Association football midfielders
People from Leiston
English Football League players
National League (English football) players
Southern Football League players